Girl or Girls, in comics, may refer to:

 Girl (Vertigo), a Vertigo mini-series by Peter Milligan
 Girls (comics), an Image Comics series by the Luna Brothers
 Girl Comics, a title from Timely Comics and Marvel Comics
 Girl (UK comics), a British comic magazine from Hulton Press
 Girl, a 1991 title from Rip Off Press
 Girl One and Girl Two, characters from Alan Moore's Top Ten comics

References

See also
Girl (disambiguation)